Lola Martinez may refer to:

Lola Martinez (broadcaster), CNN International weather anchor
Lola Martinez (Zoey 101), fictional character on American TV show Zoey 101